Kiswarniyuq (Quechua kiswar a species of shrub or tree (Buddleja incana), -ni, -yuq suffixes, "the one with kiswar", Hispanicized spellings Quisuarnioc) is a  mountain in the Andes of Peru, about  high. It is situated in the Ayacucho Region, Parinacochas Province, Coracora District. Kiswarniyuq lies between Suparawra in the north and Pumawiri in the south.

References 

Mountains of Peru
Mountains of Ayacucho Region